Zuccoli is a suburb in the City of Palmerston, Northern Territory, Australia, located to the south-west of Palmerston City. Its postal code is 0832. It was registered on the 3rd of April 2007.

The Zuccoli Plaza shopping centre is in the suburb. It has an IGA supermarket, a gym, a medical center, a chemist, a coffee shop and nine other shops.

Name origin
Zuccoli is named after Guido Zuccoli (1940–1997), an internationally competing aerobatics pilot and Northern Territory businessman.

Education
There are two primary schools situated in the suburb of Zuccoli:

 Mother Teresa Catholic Primary School, Zuccoli
 Zuccoli Primary School

References

Populated places in the Northern Territory